Marek Stefan Borowski (born 4 January 1946 in Warsaw, Poland) is a Polish left-wing politician. He led the Democratic Left Alliance (SLD) for a time and was Speaker of the Sejm (the lower, more powerful, house of Poland's parliament) from 2001 to 2004.

Biography
He was born to a Polish-Jewish family, as a son of Janina and Wiktor Borowski(born as Aron Berman).

He was Minister of Finance of Poland from 1993 to 1994. From 2004 to January 2009 he was the leader and chairman, of a new Polish left-wing party called Social Democracy of Poland (SdPl), formed from a break-away group of SLD. He was a candidate in the presidential elections in 2005, but he got fourth place, with 10%.

Marek Borowski is an MP from Piła, but in the September 2005 parliamentary elections he contested a seat in Warsaw. Borowski was the Social Democratic presidential candidate in the 2005 Polish presidential elections. Just as his party received a massive defeat in the September 2005 Parliamentary elections, Borowski lost the presidential elections, receiving 10% of the vote and fourth place, despite Aleksander Kwaśniewski's support following the withdrawal of Włodzimierz Cimoszewicz.

He most recently ran (unsuccessfully) for the office of mayor of Warsaw in the 2010 local elections.

See also

2005 Polish presidential election

References

External links
Private website
Marek Borowski – Friend of Russia, and of the Russia's Opponents

1946 births
Living people
Politicians from Warsaw
20th-century Polish economists
21st-century Polish Jews
Deputy Prime Ministers of Poland
Finance Ministers of Poland
Marshals of the Sejm of the Third Polish Republic
Deputy Marshals of the Sejm of the Third Polish Republic
Candidates in the 2005 Polish presidential election
Polish United Workers' Party members
Democratic Left Alliance politicians
Members of the Polish Sejm 1991–1993
Members of the Polish Sejm 1993–1997
Members of the Polish Sejm 1997–2001
Members of the Polish Sejm 2001–2005
Members of the Polish Sejm 2007–2011
Recipients of the Order of the Cross of Terra Mariana, 1st Class
Recipients of the National Order of Merit (Malta)
Members of the Senate of Poland 2011–2015
Members of the Senate of Poland 2015–2019
Members of the Senate of Poland 2019–2023